The Daimler-Benz DB 007 (RLM (Reichsluftfahrtministerium - Reich Air Ministry) designation ZTL 109-007, company designation ZTL6001) was an early German jet engine design stemming from design work carried out by Karl Leist from 1939. This was a complex design featuring contra-rotating stages and a bypass fan, making it one of the earliest turbofan designs to be produced. The end result of the design work was built as the DB 007 and began testing on a test-bed on 27 May 1943. Due to the expected low performance, complexity and the good results achieved by much simpler designs, work was halted on the DB 007 in May 1944 by order of the RLM.

Design and development
After initial studies on gas turbines in the late 1920s, Daimler-Benz lost interest in them until 1939 with the arrival of Karl Leist. Work began immediately on the DB 670 (aka ZTL 5000), a ducted fan with compressor feeding an afterburner, driven by a DB 604 X-24 engine delivering . After a brief interlude studying pulse-jets Leist began work on what was to become the DB007. 

Previous design efforts in Germany had investigated ducted fans (turbofans / by-pass turbojets) and contra-rotating compressor spools, but Leist incorporated both into the ZTL6000 (precursor to the ZTL 6001 / DB 007), resulting in a very complex design. Another novel feature was a turbine which passed alternately through the combustion chamber efflux and cooling air tapped from the bypass flow. By the Summer of 1942 design goals had been revised down and the new engine was given the designations ZTL6001 (company) and DB 007 / ZTL 109-007 (RLM), ZTL being an acronym for Zweikreiststurbinen-Luftstrahltriebwerk (two-circuit turbojet engine).

Air entered the engine through a conventional air intake, flow splitting after the initial guide vanes to the compressor inside and the ducted fan outside, with a by-pass ratio of approximately 2.45:1. The compressor consisted of seventeen stages of blading, eight carried on the inner drum, rotating at full engine speed, and nine on the outer drum which rotated in the opposite direction at 0.5:1 engine speed. Although extremely complicated mechanically, a compressor efficiency of 80% was expected with a very credible pressure ratio of 8:1. For comparison, typical engines of the era offered pressure ratios on the order of 3.5:1.

Further complication arose from the ducted fan which consisted of three stages of blading attached to the outside of the rotating compressor casing, with stators attached to the inside of the engine outer casing. Calculated efficiency of the fan section was 84%.

Air from the compressor passed to the four linked tubular combustion chambers, spaced evenly around the circumference with gaps to allow cool bypass air tapped from the by-pass duct to cool the turbine directly. Although this resulted in relatively poor turbine efficiency, at 74%, the cooling allowed a far higher Turbine Inlet Temperature (TIT) increasing the overall efficiency of combustion.

The turbine consisted of hollow nickel steel blading on a forged steel turbine wheel which drove the compressor via a hollow shaft and flexible coupling. the inner compressor drum was driven directly but a reduction gearbox drove the outer drum at half speed.

Structural materials were mainly cast aluminium alloys forward of the combustion chamber and welded sheet steel from the combustion chambers aft.

Operational history
Only bench testing had been achieved before the program was cancelled in May 1944.

Specifications (DB 007 / ZTL 6001)

See also

Notes

Bibliography

 

Daimler-Benz aircraft engines
1940s turbojet engines